The following is a list of films by Edwin S. Porter, head producer at the Edison Manufacturing Company, owned by Thomas A. Edison, between 1901 and 1909. Other films were produced at Rex and Famous Players Film Company.

1901
The Artist's Dilemma - (2 minutes) an artist asleep in his studio and his dream of a clock opening and a beautiful woman coming out of it
Panorama of Esplanade by Night
Execution of Czolgosz with Panorama of Auburn Prison - (3:24 minutes) reenactment of the execution of Leon Czolgosz by electric chair
Trapeze Disrobing Act
The Martyred Presidents - (1 minute) on the assassination U.S. Presidents—Abraham Lincoln, James A. Garfield, and William McKinley
Rubes in the Theatre
Sampson-Schley Controversy
Circular Panorama of Electric Tower
Soubrette's Troubles on a Fifth Avenue Stage Coach
The Farmer and the Bad Boys
The Reversible Divers
Weary Willie' and the GardenerWhat Happened on Twenty-third Street, New York City - (77 seconds) film depicting a woman walking over a grate, the hot air lifting her skirtHow the Dutch Beat the IrishThe Tramp's Strategy That FailedAnother Job for the Undertaker - (2 minutes) fantasy-comedy filmLaura Comstock's Bag-Punching DogPie, Tramp and the BulldogHappy Hooligan April-FooledHappy Hooligan SurprisedThe Automatic Weather ProphetLove by the Light of the Moon - (1 minute) the moon smiles down on two loversThe Donkey PartyKansas Saloon Smashers - (1 minute) a satire of American activist Carrie NationThe Old Maid Having Her Picture TakenWhy Mr. Nation Wants a DivorceThe Finish of Bridget McKeenTerrible Teddy, the Grizzly King (61 seconds) political satire on vice-president Theodore RooseveltDay at the Circus - (50 seconds) depicts a parade of the Great Forepaugh and Sells Bros. Combined Circus followed by a horse race in the tentThe Old Maid in the HorsecarThe Tramp's Unexpected Skate1902How They Do Things on the BoweryRock of AgesThe Interrupted BathersJack and the BeanstalkAppointment by TelephoneBabies Rolling EggsFun in a Bakery ShopGreat Bull FightThe Golden ChariotsThe Burlesque Suicide, No. 2Burning of Durland's Riding AcademyChinese Shaving SceneThe Weary Hunters and the MagicianUncle Josh at the Moving Picture Show1903The Great Train RobberyWhat Happened in the TunnelA Romance of the RailThe Extra TurnThe Heavenly Twins at LunchThe Heavenly Twins at OddsThe Messenger Boy's MistakeRube and FenderUncle Tom's Cabin (1903 film)Little Lillian, Toe DanseuseRube and Mandy at Coney IslandSubub Surprises the BurglarThe Gay Shoe ClerkNew York City Dumping WharfNew York City 'Ghetto' Fish MarketLife of an American FiremanThe Unappreciated JokeElectrocuting an Elephant (possibly with or by Jacob Blair Smith) - film of the execution of Topsy the elephant by the owners of Luna Park on Coney island.

1904The Ex-ConvictThe Strenuous Life; or, Anti-Race SuicideScarecrow PumpA Rube Couple at a County FairLove Will Find a WayParsifalCapture of the 'Yegg' Bank BurglarsThe European Rest CureHow a French Nobleman Got a Wife Through the 'New York Herald' Personal ColumnsNervy Nat Kisses the Bride'Weary Willie' Kidnaps a ChildDog FactoryWestern Stage Coach Hold UpPranks of Buster Brown and His Dog TigeAnimated PaintingCasey's Frightful DreamMidnight IntruderManiac ChaseRector's to Claremont1905The Night Before ChristmasPolice Chasing Scorching AutoLife of an American PolicemanThe Train WreckersPhoebe SnowEverybody Works But FatherDown on the FarmThe Miller's DaughterThe Watermelon PatchPoor AlgyThe White Caps (with Wallace McCutcheon Sr.)Boarding School GirlsThe Little Train RobberyThe Electric MuleScenes and Incidents, Russo-Japanese Peace Conference, Portsmouth, N. H.Mystic Shriner's DayStolen by GypsiesJune's Birthday PartyConey Island at NightHippodrome Races, Dreamland, Coney IslandThe Whole Dam Family and the Dam DogStart of Ocean Race for Cup'
A Five Cent Trolley Ride
Opening of Belmont Park Race Course
The Burglar's Slide for Life'''How Jones Lost His RollPresident Roosevelt's InaugurationThe KleptomaniacThe Seven Ages1906The Honeymoon at Niagara FallsGetting EvidenceHow the Office Boy Saw the Ball GameKathleen MavourneenWaiting at the Church
Life of a Cowboy
Three American Beauties
The Terrible Kids
A Winter Straw Ride
Dream of a Rarebit Fiend

1907
A Little Girl Who Did Not Believe in Santa Claus
Laughing Gas
College Chums
The Trainer's Daughter or A Race for Love
Midnight Ride of Paul Revere
Three American Beauties, No. 2
Jack the Kisser
A Race for Millions
The Rivals
Stage Struck
The Nine Lives of a Cat
Cohen's Fire Sale
Lost in the Alps
The 'Teddy' Bears, with Wallace McCutcheon
Vesta Victoria Singing "Poor John"
Vesta Victoria Singing "Waiting at the Church"
Daniel Boone

1908

Under Northern Skies, directed by J. Searle Dawley under Porter's supervision
A Persistent Suitor
The Lost New Year's Dinner, directed by J. Searle Dawley under Porter's supervision
Turning Over a New Leaf, directed by J. Searle Dawley under Porter's supervision
An Unexpected Santa Claus
A Street Waif's Christmas, directed by J. Searle Dawley under Porter's supervision
The Angel Child
The Tale the Ticker Told, directed by J. Searle Dawley under Porter's supervision
Miss Sherlock Holmes
Old Maid's Temperance Club
Lord Feathertop, directed by J. Searle Dawley under Porter's supervision
The King's Pardon
The Lady or the Tiger, directed by J. Searle Dawley under Porter's supervision
Colonial Virginia, Historical Scenes and Incidents Connected with the Founding of Jamestown, VA
The New Stenographer
She, directed by J. Searle Dawley under Porter's supervision
The Lovers' Telegraphic Code
The Jester, directed by J. Searle Dawley under Porter's supervision
Saved by Love
A Football Warrior, directed by J. Searle Dawley under Porter's supervision
The Army of Two (An Incident During the American Revolution)
A Fool for Luck; or, Nearly a Policeman, directed by J. Searle Dawley under Porter's supervision
Minstrel Mishaps
Ex-Convict No. 900
The Bridge of Sighs, directed by J. Searle Dawley under Porter's supervision
A Voice from the Dead
The Lover's Guide, directed by J. Searle Dawley under Porter's supervision
The Pickanimmies
Sandy MCherson's Quiet Fishing Trip
Pocahontas: A Child of the Forest
The Leprechaun: An Irish Fairy Story, directed by J. Searle Dawley under Porter's supervision
Ingomar, directed by J. Searle Dawley under Porter's supervision
Buying a Title
Wifey's Strategy
The Devil
Heard Over the Phone
A Comedy in Black and White
Life's a Game of Cards, directed by J. Searle Dawley under Porter's supervision
Tales the Searchlight Told
Romance of a War Nurse
When Ruben Comes to Town, directed by J. Searle Dawley under Porter's supervision
A Dumb Hero, directed by J. Searle Dawley under Porter's supervision
The Face on the Bar-Room Floor
Fly Paper
The Boston Tea Party, directed by J. Searle Dawley under Porter's supervision
The Little Conswain of the Varsity 8
Pioneers Crossing the Pains in '49
Love Will Find a Way
Honesty Is the Best Policy
The Blue and the Gray; or, The Days of '61
Skiny's Finish
The Painter's Revenge
Curious Mr. Curio
The Gentleman Burglar
Bridal Couple Dodging Cameras
The Merry Widow Waltz Craze
Nero and the Burning of Rome
Tale the Autumn Leaves Told
The Cowboy and the Schoolmarm
A Country Girl's Life and Experiences
Stage Memories of an Old Theatrical Trunk
Animated Snowballs
Nellie, the Pretty Typewriter
Playmates
Cupid's Pranks
A Sculptor's Welsh Rarebit
A Yankee Man-o-Warsman's Fight for Love
Fireside Reminiscences
Rescued from an Eagle's Nest
A Suburbanite's Ingenious Alarm

1909
Faust
A Gift from Santa Claus
The House of Cards
The Heart of a Clown
The Three Kisses
A Great Game
The Temptation
A Child of the Forest
The Price of a Soul
A Coward
Love's Sacrifice
A Child's Prayer
See a Pin and Pick It Up, All That Day You'll Have Good Luck
The Pony Express
Fuss and Feathers
The Doctored Dinner Pail
An Unsuccessful Substitution
Uncle Tom Wins
A Cup of Tea and She
Father's First Half-Holiday
Unappreciated Genius
On the Western Frontier
Hard to Beat
Oh! Rats!
A Cry from the Wilderness; or, A Tale of the Esquimaux and Midnight Sun
A Midnight Supper
Love Is Blind
Mary Jane's Lovers
The Colored Stenographer
A Bird in a Gilded Cage
A Daughter of the Sun
The Adventures of an Old Flirt
A Modest Young Man
A Burglar Cupid
Where Is My Wandering Boy Tonight?

1910
The Winning of Miss Langdon
The Cowpuncher's Glove
The Greater Love
His Mother's Thanksgiving
The Toymaker, the Doll and the Devil
The Stolen Claim
Riders of the Plains
The Farmer's Daughter
Ononko's Vow
Almost a Hero
Alice's Adventures in Wonderland
Love and the Law
The Attack on the Mill
Peg Woffington
The Old Loves and the New
Out of the Night
Russia, the Land of Oppression
All on Account of a Laundry Mark
Her First Appearance
For Her Sister's Sake
The Heart of a Rose
Bradford's Claim
A Western Romance
Ranson's Folly
The Livingston Case
Luck of Roaring Camp
The Engineer's Romance
Pardners
Too Many Girls

1911
Leaves of a Romance
Lost Illusions
A Cure for Crime
The Rose and the Dagger
The Lighthouse by the Sea
The White Red Man
Money to Burn
Sherlock Holmes, Jr.
A Famous Duel
On the Brink
Madeline's Rebellion
Captain Nell
A Buried Past
Silver Threads Among the Gold
The Strike at the Mines
The Test of Love
A Night of Terror
By the Light of the Moon
The Iron Master
The Price of Victory
A Heroine of '76
The Lover and the Count

1912
The Convict's Parole

1913
The Count of Monte Cristo
His Neighbor's Wife
In the Bishop's Carriage
The Prisoner of Zenda

1914
The Crucible
Such a Little Queen
The Spitfire
Tess of the Storm Country
A Good Little Devil
Hearts Adrift

1915
Lydia Gilmore
The Prince and the Pauper
Bella Donna
Zaza
The White Pearl
Sold
Jim the Penman
The Eternal City
When We Were Twenty-One
Niobe
The Morals of Marcus

References

External links

Films directed by Edwin S. Porter
Porter, Edwin S